William Frank Currier (born January 1, 1955) is a former American football safety in the National Football League for the Houston Oilers, New England Patriots, and New York Giants.  He played college football at the University of South Carolina and was drafted in the ninth round of the 1977 NFL Draft.  Since 1992, he has been athletic director at Ben Lippen School in Columbia, South Carolina.

References

External links
 Ben Lippen School Bio

1955 births
Living people
People from Glen Burnie, Maryland
Players of American football from Maryland
American football cornerbacks
American football safeties
Houston Oilers players
New England Patriots players
New York Giants players
South Carolina Gamecocks football players